Ninglashaini Secondary Boarding School (NSBS) is a private school in Dehimandu-6, Baitadi, Nepal. 

NSBS was established on 2057 BS. It was opened by Dev Shing Bohara and Hemraj Bhatta is the current principle  

NSBS has approximately 500 students studied.  The main teachers of the NSBS are Gajendra Chand, Hari Singh Joshi, Ram Datt Joshi, Ramesh Bhatta, Ram Shyam Bijale, Jagadish Bhatta and Krishna Bhatta. Rajesh Bhatta is the monitor of this school. 

Boarding schools in Nepal